The Sarnia City Council is the governing body for the city of Sarnia, Ontario, Canada. 

The council consists of nine elected members: the Mayor, four members who serve as city and Lambton County council members, and four members elected as city councillors. The Mayor and all council members are elected to four-year terms and are elected at-large across the municipality.

Current Sarnia City Council

References

External links 

Municipal councils in Ontario
Sarnia